Diocesan Sisters College was a sisters' college in Bloomfield, Connecticut.  It was formed in 1949.  Its primary goal was to educate nuns who would then be teachers in Catholic schools.  It closed in 1969.

References

Bloomfield, Connecticut
Defunct private universities and colleges in Connecticut
Defunct Catholic universities and colleges in the United States
Educational institutions established in 1949
Educational institutions disestablished in 1969
1949 establishments in Connecticut
Catholic universities and colleges in Connecticut
Sisters' colleges